Shirai (written:  or ) is a Japanese surname. Notable people with the surname include:

, Japanese footballer
, Japanese karateka, teaching in Italy
, Japanese professional wrestler
, Japanese manga artist and writer
, Japanese gymnast
, Japanese footballer
, Japanese keyboardist
, Japanese professional wrestler
, Japanese plant pathologist
 Noriyasu Shirai, survivor of China Airlines Flight 140
, Japanese swimmer
, Japanese volleyball player
, Japanese boxer
, Japanese voice actor

Fictional characters 
, a character in the manga Great Teacher Onizuka
, the protagonist in the video game Blue Reflection
, a character in the manga Love Hina
, a character in the manga Urusei Yatsura
, a character in Kamen Rider Blade
, a side character in Toaru Majutsu no Index, and a supporting character in Toaru Kagaku no Railgun
, a character in Wandering Son
, a character in the manga Kodomo no Jikan

See also 
 Shirai (grape), another name for the Azerbaijani wine grape Madrasa

Japanese-language surnames